Fondation Agir Contre l'Exclusion (FACE) is a private foundation in France. The aim is to help young people from humble backgrounds to join the private sector.

Overview
It was founded by Martine Aubry in 1993. The founding partner companies were AXA, Groupe Casino, Club Med, Crédit Lyonnais, Danone, Darty, FIMALAC, Euro-RSCG-Havas, Lyonnaise des Eaux, Péchiney, RATP, Renault, and Sodexho. Its current President is Gérard Mestrallet, the CEO of GDF Suez. Bernard Kouchner is a board member.

References

External links
Official website

Foundations based in France